Corey Vincent Croom (born May 22, 1971) is a former American football running back who played three seasons with the New England Patriots of the National Football League (NFL). He played college football at Ball State University and attended Sandusky High School in Sandusky, Ohio.

Early years
Croom lettered two seasons in football and three seasons in track and field at Sandusky High School. He earned UPI all-state honors his senior year after helping the team win the UPI state championship. He was also named All-Erie Shore Conference, all-district, and Erie Shore Conference Player of the Year.

College career
Croom played football for the Ball State Cardinals. He won the John Magnabosco Award for being the Cardinals' most valuable player in 1992. He was a two-time Mid-American Conference first-team selection. He recorded 2,725 rushing yards and 17 rushing touchdowns in his college career. Croom led NCAA Division I football with 301 rushing attempts in 1992.

Professional career
Croom was signed by the New England Patriots of the NFL on April 30, 1993 after going undrafted in the 1993 NFL draft. He was released by the Patriots on August 30, 1993 and signed to the team's practice squad on August 31, 1993. He appeared in 43 games for the Patriots from 1993 to 1995. He scored one touchdown (December 26, 1993) against the Colts n a 5 yard run. After not carrying the ball all season in 1994, Croom was a surprise starter in the Patriots 20-13 wild card loss against the Browns on January 1, 1995. Croom played admirably, carrying the ball 9 times for 35 yards and catching one pass for 5 yards.

References

External links
Just Sports Stats
College stats

Living people
1971 births
American football running backs
African-American players of American football
Ball State Cardinals football players
New England Patriots players
Players of American football from Ohio
Sportspeople from Sandusky, Ohio
21st-century African-American sportspeople
20th-century African-American sportspeople